The Skif BigSkif Bi is a Ukrainian two-place paraglider that was designed by Sergei Rozhko and produced by Skif Paragliding of Feodosia in the mid-2000s. It is now out of production.

Design and development
The aircraft was designed as a tandem glider for flight training and as such was referred to as the BigSkif Bi, indicating "bi-place" or two seater.

Specifications (BigSkif Bi)

References

BigSkif Bi
Paragliders